Rahimabad (also Romanized as Raḩīmābād) is a village in Zahray-ye Pain Rural District, in the Central District of Buin Zahra County, Qazvin Province, Iran. At the 2006 census, its population was 671, in 150 families.

References 

Populated places in Buin Zahra County